Deaton-Flanigen Productions is an American film company based in Nashville, Tennessee. The company was named after the surnames of founders Robert Deaton III and George Flanigen IV. The two have directed multiple music videos, primarily in the field of country music. One of the duo's first music videos, Vern Gosdin's "That Just About Does It", won them an award at the 32nd Annual International Film and TV Festival. Deaton Flanigen has also been nominated for Best Music Video at the Country Music Association, including a nomination for Martina McBride's "A Broken Wing" in 1998.

The production company has also done the start of Monday Night Football since 1989 (ABC: to 2005, ESPN: since 2006).

Videography

Films directed
 Benched (2018)

Music videos directed
200 music videos are currently listed here.

References

American music video directors
Entertainment companies of the United States
Music production companies
Video production companies
Companies based in Tennessee
Companies established in the 1980s
Filmmaking duos
American film directors